Ahmed Abdi Karie, nicknamed "Qoor Qoor", is the current President of Galmudug. He assumed office on 2 February 2020.

Background

Personal life
Karie hails from the Saleeban sub-clan of Habar Gidir, and was born in the coastal city of Hobyo in 1968.

Career

Galmudug politics
Prior to becoming Galmudug's president, Karie was the minister of state for the ministry of public works, reconstruction and public-housing of the federal government of Somalia. His assumption of the office of president is the first time Karie has held any office within Galmudug's government. Due to Karie being a novice to Galmudug politics, some critics have stated that someone with prior experience within the Galmudug cabinet should have been chosen as president.

Galmudug president
According to Karie, his main tasks as president are to disarm and integrate local clan militias into the state security forces and the construction of the Hobyo port. One form of amendment that has been cited as being required is an overhaul in the manner of the transition of power, as outgoing president Gelle's term expiry appeared to some correspondents to have an arbitrary schedule.

On 2 June 2020, President Karie announced a new plan to disarm clan militias in Galmudug, following a speech he delivered in Galkacyo. On the other hand, he announced all illegal firearms that were in "different hands" would be recovered.

Relationship with the federal government
Karie markedly differentiated himself from other holders of Somali federal presidencies by stating that he has a close relationship with Somalia's central government. Third party news outlets also confirmed that Karie was close to Somalia's ruling party and central government.

See also
Politics of Somalia
Lists of office-holders

References

Presidents of Galmudug
Government ministers of Somalia
Somali National University alumni
Living people
1968 births